Gary Lynn Zeller (November 20, 1947 – February 5, 1996) was an American professional basketball player. He played college basketball for the Drake Bulldogs and played in the National Basketball Association for the Baltimore Bullets for parts of two seasons. He then played for the New York Nets during the 1971–72 season. In 90 career games, he averaged 8.7 minutes and 3.2 points per game.

References

1947 births
1996 deaths
American men's basketball players
Baltimore Bullets (1963–1973) draft picks
Baltimore Bullets (1963–1973) players
Basketball players from Houston
Drake Bulldogs men's basketball players
Lamar High School (Houston, Texas) alumni
Long Beach City Vikings men's basketball players
New York Nets players
Shooting guards